Marguerite Elton Harrison (1879–1967) was an American reporter, spy, filmmaker and translator. She was also one of the four founding members of the Society of Woman Geographers.

Biography
Harrison was born Marguerite Elton Baker, one of two daughters of wealthy Maryland shipping magnate Bernard N. Baker and his wife Elizabeth Elton (Livezey) Baker.

Born into inherited wealth, she and her sisters were raised as society princesses. She adored her father, who built and would later lose his lucrative Atlantic Transport Line, but her relationship with her overprotective and all-controlling mother was distant and cold.

In 1907, her sister Elizabeth married Albert C. Ritchie, who would later become the 49th governor of Maryland. When Harrison's first and only semester at Radcliffe College was punctuated by an affair with her landlady's son, her mother abruptly shipped her to Italy. In June 1901, despite her mother's vehement protestations, she succeeded in marrying a young man without money, Thomas B. Harrison. Their son, Thomas B. Harrison II, was born in 1902.

Children's Hospital School 
In 1905, Harrison spearheaded an effort to open a school for indigent convalescent children. She used her many connections to procure donations and offered a large stone house owned by her father in Catonsville, Maryland. The school was initially called the Ingleside Convalescent Home but was later known as the Children's Hospital School. Harrison concocted many schemes to raise funds for the school, including a charity baseball game and a circus performed by prominent society members. In 1911, Harrison was named to the board of directors of the Women's Civic League of Baltimore, which advocated for safer and cleaner streets and schools.

The Baltimore Sun
In 1915, Harrison's husband died of a brain tumor, leaving her and her 13-year-old son deeply in debt from his outstanding loans. In an unsuccessful effort to repay the debt, she converted her large home into a boarding house. In 1915, despite having completed only one semester of college and with no appropriate training, she used her brother-in-law's influence to secure a position as an assistant society editor for The Baltimore Sun at $20 per week. With her society background and familiarity with foreign languages, she advanced quickly within the newspaper. By 1917, she was writing features about women's wartime labor.

Spying
In 1918, with the U.S. still involved in World War I and Europe virtually one large battlefield, Harrison wished to report on the conditions in Germany. As women were not recognized as war correspondents, she instead became a spy after being introduced to General Marlborough Churchill, head of the Military Intelligence Branch of the War Department. On her application, Harrison described herself as five feet six inches tall, weighing 125 pounds without physical defects and with no use of stimulants, tobacco or drugs. In response to a question asking about foreign nations and localities with which she was familiar, she replied:The British Isles, France, Holland, Germany, Italy, Austria, Switzerland, Northern Italy, Rome, Naples, Tyrol. I have an absolute command of French and German, am very fluent and have a good accent in Italian and speak a little Spanish. Without any trouble I could pass as a French woman and after a little practice, as German-Swiss ... I have been to Europe fourteen times ... I have been much on steamers and am familiar in a general way with ships of the merchant marine. 
 
The November 11, 1918 armistice was declared before she was officially hired, but Harrison was sent to Europe with a new assignment to report on political and economic matters at the forthcoming peace conference. Only her immediate family and her managing editor at The Baltimore Sun knew why she traveled to Germany in December 1918.

Harrison spied for the United States in the Soviet Union and Japan. She arrived in the Soviet Union in 1920 as an Associated Press correspondent and assessed Bolshevik economic strengths and weakness and assisted American political prisoners. She was detained in the infamous Russian prison Lubyanka for 10 months, where she contracted tuberculosis. Because of pressure applied by her influential contacts, such as Maryland senator Joseph I. France, she was eventually set free in exchange for food and other aid to the Soviet Union. She was arrested again in 1923 in China and was taken to Moscow, but was released before her trial after she was recognized by an American aid worker.

These experiences, and those of her fellow prisoners, are related in two of Harrison's books: Marooned in Moscow: the Story of an American Woman Imprisoned in Russia (1921) and Unfinished Tales from a Russian Prison (1923). She expressed her views of the Soviet Union and China as world forces in her book Red Bear or Yellow Dragon (1924). These books, along with her volume Asia Reborn (1928), comprise her major publications on Asia.

Harrison was an important member and sponsor of the production team responsible for the classic ethnographic film Grass (1925). Harrison had met producer Merian C. Cooper at a ball in Warsaw during the early days of the Russo-Polish conflict and provided him with food, books and blankets when he was taken prisoner by the Russians in 1920 and sent to work in a prison camp. Grass depicts the annual migration of the Bakhtiari, an Iranian tribe who herded their livestock through snow-bound mountain passes under conditions of great hardship to reach high-altitude summer grasslands and then to return to lower elevations for the winter. Harrison appears as herself in her role as a reporter in the film. Cooper's co-producer Ernest B. Schoedsack opined years later that Harrison had not done "a damn thing" during the expedition.

As women were excluded from membership in most professional organizations such as the Explorers Club, Harrison participated in the founding of Society of Woman Geographers in 1925. Harrison also founded the Children's Hospital School in Baltimore.

Later life and death 
Following her participation with Grass, Harrison married and moved to Los Angeles. In 1942, she offered her services to the FBI in the war effort, but the agency demurred.

Harrison died on July 16, 1967 in Baltimore at the age of 88.

Works
 Marooned in Moscow: the Story of an American Woman Imprisoned in Russia (1921)
 Unfinished Tales from a Russian Prison (1923). (short stories)
 Red Bear or Yellow Dragon (1924).
 Asia Reborn (1928)
 There's Always Tomorrow: the Story of a Checkered Life (1935)

References

Notes

Bibliography
 
 Griggs, Catherine M. (1996) Beyond Boundaries:The Adventurous Life of Marguerite Harrison (Archived). Ph D dissertation, George Washington University.
 
King, Melanie (2018). The Lady is a Spy: The Tangled Lives of Stan Harding & Marguerite Harrison. Ashgrove Publishing. 
 
 
 
 

1879 births
1967 deaths
American spies
American women journalists
Female wartime spies
World War I spies for the United States
Members of the Society of Woman Geographers
Women's page journalists
American anti-communists
20th-century American women